Polemocrates from Elimeia was father of Macedonian general Coenus and of a commander Cleander. Polemocrates had been allotted estates in Chalcidice in the reign of Philip II of Macedon.

References

Ancient Elimiotes
4th-century BC Greek people